Sir John St. John (after 1360 – 26 December 1424), of Paulerspury, Northamptonshire and Fonmon, Glamorgan, was a politician.

He was a Member (MP) of the Parliament of England for Northamptonshire in 1410, 1411, March 1416 and May 1421.

References

14th-century births
1424 deaths
English MPs 1410
15th-century Welsh politicians
People from Glamorgan
People from West Northamptonshire District
English MPs 1411
English MPs March 1416
English MPs May 1421